Nabiabad (also Romanized as Nabīābād; also known as Naghi Abad) is a village in Bardesareh Rural District, Oshtorinan District, Borujerd County, Lorestan Province, Iran. At the 2006 census, its population was 121, in 32 families.

References 

Towns and villages in Borujerd County